Finland competed at the 1964 Winter Olympics in Innsbruck, Austria.

Medalists

Alpine skiing

Men

Men's slalom

Biathlon

Men

 1 Two minutes added per miss.

Cross-country skiing

Men

Men's 4 × 10 km relay

Women

Women's 3 x 5 km relay

Ice hockey

First round
Winners (in bold) qualified for the Group A to play for 1st-8th places. Teams, which lost their qualification matches, played in Group B for 9th-16th places.

|}

Medal round 

Finland 4-0 Switzerland
Czechoslovakia 4-0 Finland
Sweden 7-0 Finland
USSR 10-0 Finland
Canada 6-2 Finland
Finland 3-2 USA
Germany (UTG) 2-1 Finland

Nordic combined 

Events:
 normal hill ski jumping 
 15 km cross-country skiing

Ski jumping

Speed skating

Men

Women

References
Official Olympic Reports
International Olympic Committee results database
 Olympic Winter Games 1964, full results by sports-reference.com

Nations at the 1964 Winter Olympics
1964
1964 in Finnish sport